Reginald John Piper (born 25 February 1942) was an assistant bishop in the Anglican Diocese of Sydney who served as the Bishop of Wollongong from 1993 to 2007.

Piper was born in Goulburn and educated at Corrimal High School and at the Australian National University. After studying at Moore Theological College he was ordained in 1967. He had curacies at St Stephen's Willoughby and St Clement's Lalor Park before incumbencies at St Aidan's Hurstville Grove, Christ Church, Kiama and Holy Trinity, Adelaide before his ordination to the episcopate. He is married to Dorothy Piper.

References

1942 births
People from Goulburn
Australian National University alumni
Moore Theological College alumni
20th-century Anglican bishops in Australia
21st-century Anglican bishops in Australia
Assistant bishops in the Anglican Diocese of Sydney
Living people